Kosovar–Mongolian relations are foreign relations between and Kosovo and Mongolia.

History 
On 8 May 2009, Kosovo's president Fatmir Sejdiu met Nyamaa Enkhbold, the Mongolian Deputy Parliament Speaker, to request recognition of Kosovo by Mongolia. Enkhbold reportedly promised to deal with the request once he had returned home.

In a 17 July 2012 meeting with Kosovo's deputy prime minister, Edita Tahiri, both the Mongolian president and the Minister of Foreign Affairs and Trade, Tsakhiagiin Elbegdorj and Gombojav Zandanshatar, said that Mongolia would consider recognising the independence of Kosovo. Elbegdorj promised that Mongolia would seriously consider recognising the independence of Kosovo in the very near future, and had a very high appreciation for the movement of the people of Kosovo for freedom and independence. Zandanshatar promised that his country would deliberate the issue of recognising Kosovo's independence.

See also 

 Foreign relations of Kosovo
 Foreign relations of Mongolia

Notes

References 

Mongolia
Bilateral relations of Mongolia